Mezlocillin is a broad-spectrum penicillin antibiotic. It is active against both Gram-negative and some Gram-positive bacteria. Unlike most other extended spectrum penicillins, it is excreted by the liver, therefore it is useful for biliary tract infections, such as ascending cholangitis.

Mechanism of action

Like all other beta-lactam antibiotics, mezlocillin inhibits the third and last stage of bacterial cell wall synthesis by binding to penicillin binding proteins. This ultimately leads to cell lysis.

Susceptible organisms

Gram-negative

 Bacteroides spp., including B. fragilis
 Enterobacter spp.
 Escherichia coli
 Haemophilus influenzae
 Klebsiella species
 Morganella morganii
 Neisseria gonorrhoeae
 Proteus mirabilis
 Proteus vulgaris
 Providencia rettgeri
 Pseudomonas spp., including P. aeruginosa
 Serratia marcescens

Gram-positive
 Enterococcus faecalis
 Peptococcus spp.
 Peptostreptococcus spp.

Synthesis

Mezlocillin can be made in a variety of ways including reaction of ampicillin with chlorocarbamate 1 in the presence of triethylamine. Chlorocarbamate 1 itself is made from ethylenediamine by reaction with phosgene to form the cyclic urea followed by monoamide formation with methanesulfonyl chloride and then reaction of the other nitrogen atom with phosgene and trimethylsilylchloride.

The closely related analogue azlocillin is made in essentially the same manner as mezlocillin. but with omission of the methylation step.

References

Further  reading

External links
 
 Duke

Penicillins
Enantiopure drugs
Imidazolidinones